Piotr Klepczarek  (born 12 July 1984, in Olsztyn) is a retired Polish footballer. He is currently working for Stomil Olsztyn as a video analyst and individual coach for the youth teams.

Career
In June 2010, he joined ŁKS Łódź on a two-year contract.

Coaching career
Klepczarek retired at the end of 2018 to accept a job offer as assistant manager for Poland U20. In August 2019, he was hired as a video analyst for the first team and individual coach for the youth teams of Stomil Olsztyn.

References

External links 
 
 Piotr Klepczarek at Soccerway

Polish footballers
1984 births
ŁKS Łódź players
OKS Stomil Olsztyn players
Mławianka Mława players
Kujawiak Włocławek players
Polonia Warsaw players
Zawisza Bydgoszcz players
Znicz Pruszków players
Ząbkovia Ząbki players
Living people
Sportspeople from Olsztyn
Association football defenders